Where the Heart Is may refer to:

In film:
 Where the Heart Is (1990 film), a film starring Dabney Coleman and Uma Thurman
 Where the Heart Is, a 1998 film directed by Robert Guédiguian
 Where the Heart Is (2000 film), a film starring Ashley Judd and Natalie Portman

In television:
 Where the Heart Is (American TV series), an American soap opera which ran from 1969 to 1973
 Where the Heart Is (British TV series), a British serial drama which ran from 1997 to 2006
 Where the Heart Is (2008 TV series), a 2008 Malaysian-Singaporean TV drama
 "Where the Heart Is" (Everwood), an episode of Everwood

In other media:
 Where the Heart Is (novel), a novel by Billie Letts, basis for the 2000 film
 "Where the Heart Is", a song by Soft Cell from The Art of Falling Apart